The Saint Francis of Assisi Parish Church, simply known as the Peñaranda Church, is a Roman Catholic parish church located at Penaranda, Nueva Ecija, Philippines. It is under the Diocese of Cabanatuan with Francis of Assisi as patron saint.

Background
The Roman Catholic parish of Peñaranda was founded in 1853. Its first church with cogon roof and stone walls was constructed by Fr. Alvaro Calleja. In 1869, Fr. Florentino Samonte ordered the commencement of the church construction. This was continued by Fr. Isidoro Prada from 1873 to 1875, and also by Fr. Candido San Miguel from 1879 to 1881. The church was finished by Fr. Santos Vega from 1887 to 1889. The convent made of bricks and stone was built by Fr. Valentin Gato de la Fuente from 1889 to 1891. In 1951, a historical marker was unveiled for the church by the National Historical Commission of the Philippines.

It is one of the Jubilee Churches for the 500 Years of Christianity in the Philippines.

Images

References

Marked Historical Structures of the Philippines
Roman Catholic churches in Nueva Ecija
19th-century Roman Catholic church buildings in the Philippines